Essama Etogoi  is a Cameroon football player who has played at KF Tirana in the Albanian Superliga.

References

Cameroonian footballers
KF Tirana players
Expatriate footballers in Albania
Kategoria Superiore players
1987 births
Living people
Association football forwards